Ephedra frustillata,  the Patagonian ephedra, is a plant species in the genus Ephedra.

The plant is found in Patagonia, southern Argentina, as well as in central and southern Chile. The shrub grows in arid areas in sandy soil, sand dunes or on rocks, in full sun and can grow up to one meter in height.

Ephedra frustillata contains apigeninidin, a 3-deoxyanthocyanidin.

References

External links

 Ephedra frustillata

frustillata
Flora of Argentina
Flora of Chile
Plants described in 1863